Dr. Aung Kyaw Oo is a 1957 Burmese black-and-white drama film, directed by Shwe Done Bi Aung starring Maung Maung Ta, May Thit and Mary Myint. British Burma Film won the Best Picture Award and Shwe Done Bi Aung won the Best Director Award in 1957 Myanmar Motion Picture Academy Awards.

Cast
Maung Maung Ta as Dr. Aung Kyaw Oo
May Thit as Khin
Mary Myint as Mary Myint
Htun Wai as Htun Wai

References

1957 films
1950s Burmese-language films
Films shot in Myanmar
Burmese black-and-white films
1957 drama films
Burmese drama films